Saasen is a station in Saasen, Hesse, Germany.

Rail services
The station is served daily by hourly Regionalbahn (RB 45) services on the Limburg (Lahn)–Weilburg–Wetzlar–Gießen–Alsfeld (Oberhess)–Fulda route. In the peak, additional Regionalbahn services run on the Gießen–Grünberg–Mücke route.

References 

Railway stations in Hesse
Buildings and structures in Giessen (district)